Jacques LaDouceur (born April 29, 1959 in Port-au-Prince, Haiti) is a Haitian-American retired soccer forward.  He played two seasons in Greece before returning to the U.S. for eight seasons of indoor soccer.  He also earned ten caps, scoring two goals, with the U.S. national team in 1984 and 1985.

Youth and college 
Born in Port-au-Prince, Haiti, LaDouceur grew up the youngest of four children raised by a single mother.  In 1967, his mother gained an opportunity to move to the U.S. to work in the textile industry.  In the fall of 1969, his mother had saved enough money to move the family to the U.S. and on December 12, 1969, LaDouceur landed at Kennedy Airport in New York City.  He went on to attend Fulton-Montgomery Community College in Johnstown, New York before transferring to Howard University.

Professional career 
LaDouceur began his professional career with Greek First Division club Panionios in 1982.  In 1984, he returned to the U.S. where he signed with the San Diego Sockers of Major Indoor Soccer League (MISL).  He remained with the Sockers for eight seasons, leaving the team after the 1992-1993 CISL Championship Series with the Dallas Sidekicks. During those years, the Sockers won six league championships.  LaDouceur moved to the Chicago Power of the National Professional Soccer League to finish their 1992 - 1993 season.  He played four games with the Power, scoring one goal, then retired.  In 1988, he spent the summer outdoor season with the San Jose Earthquakes in the Western Soccer Alliance.

National team 
LaDouceur earned ten caps and scored two goals with the U.S. national team in 1984 and 1985.  He made his debut in an October 9, 1984 victory over El Salvador.  He came on as a substitute for Perry Van der Beck and promptly scored.  Jeff Hooker also scored a goal in the game, his first for the national team, making this one of the few games where two players score while earning their first caps.  He played every national team game following that appearance, up to an April 4, 1985 tie with Canada.  His next, and last game, with the national team came a month later in a June 16, 1985 loss to England.

Coaching 
After retiring from playing professionally, LaDouceur joined the coaching ranks.  He is both a youth coach as well as the women's coach at Palomar College, a community college in San Diego, California.

References

External links 
 Youth club bio
 Autobiography
 MISL stats

Living people
American soccer coaches
American soccer players
Chicago Power players
Association football forwards
Haitian emigrants to the United States
Major Indoor Soccer League (1978–1992) players
National Professional Soccer League (1984–2001) players
Howard Bison men's soccer players
Panionios F.C. players
San Diego Sockers (original MISL) players
San Jose Earthquakes (1974–1988) players
United States men's international soccer players
Western Soccer Alliance players
1959 births
Haitian footballers
Sportspeople from Port-au-Prince